The discography of British pop band The Vamps comprises five studio albums and twenty-three singles.

On 29 September 2013, The Vamps released their debut single "Can We Dance", which debuted at number two on the UK Singles Chart. Their second single "Wild Heart" was released on 18 January 2014 and peaked at number 3 on the UK Singles Chart. Their third single "Last Night" was released on 6 April 2014 and also reached number two. Their debut album Meet the Vamps was released on 15 April 2014. Their fourth international single "Somebody to You", featuring Demi Lovato", debuted at number four in the UK. Their debut EP Somebody to You entered the top 10 of the US Billboard 200. Their fifth single "Oh Cecilia", which previously appeared on the album, was released on 12 October 2014 featuring Shawn Mendes.

"Wake Up", released on 2 October 2015, was the first single from their second album. "Rest Your Love", released on 27 November 2015, was the second single from their second album. "I Found a Girl" was the third single. "Cheater" was released as the first countdown single from the album on 13 October 2015, with "Stolen Moments" following. On 27 November 2015 they released Wake Up, their second album.

On 14 July 2017, The Vamps released the first part of their concept album, Night & Day (Night Edition), with the second part, Night & Day (Day Edition), being released on 13 July 2018. These two parts form their third and fourth studio albums. The albums received mixed reviews.

The band celebrated their ten years in music in 2022 with the release of a fanzine titled Ten Years Of The Vamps produced as a collaboration between band members and the fans and the 11-date 10 Years Of The Vamps - The Greatest Hits Tour that travelled across the UK and Ireland in November and December 2022.

Albums

Studio albums

Video albums

Compilation albums

Extended plays

Singles

As lead artist

As featured artist

Promotional singles

Other charted songs

Other appearances

Music videos

Notes

References

Discographies of British artists
Discography